Canada–Namibia relations are the bilateral relations between Canada and Namibia. Relations began in 1977. Both countries are members of the Commonwealth of Nations. Neither country has a resident ambassador.

History
Canada's relationship with Namibia began in 1977 when Canada joined the Western Contact Group, a joint diplomatic effort of France, United Kingdom, United States, Canada and West Germany to bring an internationally acceptable transition to independence for Namibia. In 1990, official relations started; Canada has dispatched an Honorary Consul to Windhoek.

Refugees
Canada is one of the main destinations for Namibian refugees. Together with Botswana and Denmark, Canada has been granting asylum to people fleeing Namibia in the aftermath of the Caprivi conflict, and particularly the Caprivi treason trial that followed in which the Namibian government was accused of human rights violations. Only in 2010 Canada has changed its standpoint and is now considering the CLA to be a terrorist organisation that has "attempted to usurp an elected government". Nonetheless, Canada received a steady inflow of Namibian immigrants who seek economic betterment under the pretense of humiliation and harassment in Namibia.  In 2011 more than 1,000 Namibians entered Canada.  Three quarters of them applied for refugee status, but only a few were successful.

Economic
Canadian companies are significantly invested in the mining industry of Namibia. In 2008, 99% of Canadian imports from Namibia, totaling over 246 million dollars, came in the form of uranium. In July 2010, Canadian-based company Dundee Precious Metals bought the metal smelter in Tsumeb, saving it from closure and maintaining around 200 jobs.

References

 
Namibia
Bilateral relations of Namibia